Bouhadjar is a district in El Taref Province, Algeria. It was named after its capital, Bouhadjar.

Municipalities
The district is further divided into 4 municipalities:
Bouhadjar
Oued Zitoun
Aïn Kerma
Hammam Béni Salah

Districts of El Taref Province